Diuronotus is a genus of gastrotrichs belonging to the family Muselliferidae.

The species of this genus are found in Scandinavia and Greenland.

Species:

Diuronotus aspetos 
Diuronotus rupperti

References

Gastrotricha